Koknese Municipality is a former municipality in Vidzeme, Latvia. The municipality was formed in 2009 by merging Bebri parish, Irši parish and Koknese parish the administrative centre being Koknese.

On 1 July 2021, Koknese Municipality ceased to exist and its territory was merged into Aizkraukle Municipality.

See also 
 Administrative divisions of Latvia (2009)

References 

 
Former municipalities of Latvia